The 2004 United States presidential election in North Carolina took place on November 2, 2004, and was part of the 2004 United States presidential election. Voters chose 15 representatives, or electors to the Electoral College, who voted for president and vice president.

North Carolina was won by incumbent President George W. Bush by a 12.44% margin of victory. Prior to the election, all 12 news organizations considered this a state Bush would win, or a red state. North Carolina was also the home state of Democratic Party vice presidential nominee John Edwards, who was then representing the state in the United States Senate. This was not enough for Democrats to break Republican success in this state since Jimmy Carter's victory in 1976. While winning the state comfortably, Bush's margin of 12.44% was 0.39% lower than his 2000 performance, making it the only Southern state to swing more Democratic than 2000.

Bush became the first Republican to win the White House without carrying Mecklenburg or Guilford Counties since Calvin Coolidge in 1924.

Primaries 
2004 North Carolina Democratic presidential caucuses

Campaign

Predictions
There were 12 news organizations who made state-by-state predictions of the election. Here are their last predictions before election day.

 D.C. Political Report: Likely Republican
 Associated Press: Leans Bush
 CNN: Bush
Cook Political Report: Leans Republican
 Newsweek: Leans Bush
New York Times: Solid Bush
 Rasmussen Reports: Bush
 Research 2000: Leans Bush
Washington Post: Bush
Washington Times: Solid Bush
Zogby International: Bush
 Washington Dispatch: Bush

Polling
Bush won every single pre-election poll. The final 3 poll average showed Bush leading 52% to 44%.

Fundraising
Bush raised $4,465,160. Kerry raised $2,049,794.

Advertising and visits
Neither campaign advertised or visited the state during the fall campaign.

Analysis 
John Edwards failed to make his home state competitive in the general election. In 2000, George W. Bush had performed strongly in most of the South, including North Carolina, which he had won by 12.83%. As in most of the rest of the South, he did so once again in North Carolina, notwithstanding Edwards' presence on the Democratic ticket, although his margin of victory did go down slightly, to 12.44%, even as nationally he improved from losing the popular vote by 0.5% to winning it by 2.5%. Bush consistently led in polling leading up to election day.

Bush won a majority of the 100 counties and congressional districts. The only region in the state that Kerry dominated in was the Northeastern black belt, the location of North Carolina's 1st congressional district. However, Kerry did narrowly flip two heavily populated counties, Mecklenburg and Guilford, which have gone on to give Democrats over 55% of the vote in every subsequent election as of 2020. He also cut Bush's margin in another heavily populated county, Wake, from 7.1% to 2.1%. As of 2020, Wake has gone on to give Democrats over 55% of the vote in every subsequent election save 2012. Large Democratic margins in these counties have been instrumental to making North Carolina competitive in every election from 2008 onward.

, this is the last election in which Pitt County, Forsyth County, Wilson County, Wake County, Buncombe County, and Cumberland County voted for a Republican presidential candidate.

As of 2020, this is the last election in which a presidential candidate won North Carolina by double digits, as well as the last time the state was not seriously contested.

Results

Results by county

Counties that flipped from Democratic to Republican 
 Bladen (largest municipality: Elizabethtown)
 Chowan (largest municipality: Edenton)
 Columbus (largest municipality: Whiteville)
 Cumberland (largest municipality: Fayetteville)
 Granville (largest municipality: Oxford)
 Martin (largest municipality: Williamston)
 Tyrrell (largest municipality: Columbia)

Counties that flipped from Republican to Democratic
 Guilford (largest municipality: Greensboro)
 Mecklenburg (largest municipality: Charlotte)

By congressional district
Bush won 9 of 13 congressional districts, including two held by Democrats.

Electors 

Technically the voters of North Carolina cast their ballots for electors: representatives to the Electoral College. North Carolina is allocated 15 electors because it has 13 congressional districts and 2 senators. All candidates who appear on the ballot or qualify to receive write-in votes must submit a list of 15 electors, who pledge to vote for their candidate and his or her running mate. Whoever wins the majority of votes in the state is awarded all 15 electoral votes. Their chosen electors then vote for president and vice president. Although electors are pledged to their candidate and running mate, they are not obligated to vote for them. An elector who votes for someone other than his or her candidate is known as a faithless elector.

The electors of each state and the District of Columbia met on December 13, 2004, to cast their votes for president and vice president. The Electoral College itself never meets as one body. Instead the electors from each state and the District of Columbia met in their respective capitols.

The following were the members of the Electoral College from the state. All were pledged to and voted for Bush/Cheney:
 Joseph W. Powell
 Ann Sullivan
 William B. Carraway
 Sandra Carter
 William H. Trotter
 Thomas D. Luckadoo
 Judy Keener
 Marcia M. Spiegel
 Dewitt Rhoades
 Davey G. Williamson
 Theresa Esposito
 Elizabeth Kelly
 Larry W. Potts
 Joe Morgan
 Robert Rector

References

North Carolina
2004
United States presidential